Century is a town in Escambia County, Florida, United States. Per the 2020 census, the population was 1,713. It is part of the Pensacola–Ferry Pass–Brent Metropolitan Statistical Area.

History
Century was founded in 1901 as a sawmill company town, and named because 1901 was the first year of the 20th century. A post office has been in operation at Century since 1901. On February 15, 2016, the town was hit by an EF3 tornado, heavily damaging and destroying homes, and injuring three people.

Geography

Century is located at  (30.977648, –87.261500).

Century is located in the western highlands of Florida. This physiographic province of the northern Gulf Coast region is made up of sand, silt, and clay hills. These highlands are deeply incised by creeks and rivers. Century is located on the western edge of the Escambia River floodplain. A small portion of the town (the eastern side) is within the floodplain itself. Most of the community, however, is located above the floodplain on level to gently sloping hillsides.

Century's roadway network is highly irregular. It does not conform to the state of Florida's section, township and range survey system, for two reasons. The first is because Spanish land grants were issued along the Escambia River in the 16th and 17th centuries. These boundaries established a unique survey system that contorted east-to-west survey boundaries once Florida became a state and a state survey system was adopted, at which time previously existing survey systems were "grandfathered" in. The second reason for an irregular roadway and property boundary system is due to the community originally being built around the Louisville and Nashville Railroad (now the CSX railway). Automobile highways were eventually constructed, and closely paralleled the railway. U.S. Route 29 (US 29), a more modern highway, was constructed and moved many of the commercial operations west of the small original core of the community (now mostly located within the Alger-Sullivan Lumber Company Residential Historic District).

US 29 is used by residents of Escambia County to reach points north. Alabama State Route 113 leads north from the state line to Interstate 65 and provides the area with a route to Montgomery, Birmingham and Atlanta. From a southbound perspective, Century is en route between these major cities and the coastal beaches at Pensacola Beach and Perdido Key in Florida.

Century is the western terminus of State Road 4, which leads east to the communities of Jay, Munson, Baker, and Milligan.

Fresh water supplies are abundant, with water being withdrawn as groundwater from the local sand and gravel aquifer.

In 1970, oil was discovered in the nearby community of Jay. Oil was also discovered near the town of Century, especially to its northeast. Oil became important to the local economy during the last quarter of the 20th century.

Gravel and sand is mined in open pits in and near Century. These natural mineral deposits are essential to supporting the construction industries in nearby Pensacola and Mobile, especially for use as aggregate materials in concrete.

Timber and pulpwood are other valuable natural commodities of the area. Nearby papermills at Cantontment, and Brewton, Alabama, provide a market for cut pulpwood.

Demographics

2020 census

Note: the US Census treats Hispanic/Latino as an ethnic category. This table excludes Latinos from the racial categories and assigns them to a separate category. Hispanics/Latinos can be of any race.

2000 Census
As of the census of 2000, there were 1,714 people, 680 households, and 448 families residing in the town. The population density was 522.5 inhabitants per square mile (201.8/km2). The racial makeup of the town was 39.67% White, 56.65% African American, 0.58% Native American, 0.64% Asian, 0.06% Pacific Islander, 0.35% from other races, and 2.04% from two or more races. Hispanic or Latino of any race were 1.63% of the population.

There were 680 households, out of which 29.0% had children under the age of 18 living with them, 36.5% were married couples living together, 25.9% had a female householder with no husband present, and 34.1% were non-families. 31.8% of all households were made up of individuals, and 18.1% had someone living alone who was 65 years of age or older.  The average household size was 2.52 and the average family size was 3.21.

In the town, the population was spread out, with 30.0% under the age of 18, 6.9% from 18 to 24, 24.0% from 25 to 44, 21.9% from 45 to 64, and 17.2% who were 65 years of age or older.  The median age was 37 years. For every 100 females, there were 80.6 males.  For every 100 females age 18 and over, there were 75.3 males.

The median income for a household in the town was $20,703, and the median income for a family was $28,241. Males had a median income of $26,932 versus $17,390 for females. The per capita income for the town was $10,412.  About 24.5% of families and 30.1% of the population were below the poverty line, including 41.4% of those under age 18 and 26.1% of those age 65 or over.

Economy
A Florida prison known as Century Correctional Institution is the only major employer in the region. This facility employs a full-time staff of 401, which is almost 25% of the entire population of Century.

Education 

Residents of Century and the surrounding area in Escambia County are served by the Escambia County School District.

Century is within the zones of the following schools:
 Bratt Elementary School (Bratt, Florida)
 Ernest Ward Middle School (Walnut Hill, Florida)
 Northview High School (Bratt, Florida)

References

External links
Town of Century official website
Escambia River (Northwest Florida Water Management District)

Towns in Escambia County, Florida
Towns in Pensacola metropolitan area
Towns in Florida
Former census-designated places in Florida
1901 establishments in Florida
Populated places established in 1901